Srđan Koljević (born 31 December 1966) is a Serbian screenwriter and film director.

Selected filmography

References

External links 

1966 births
Living people
Film people from Sarajevo
Serbs of Bosnia and Herzegovina
Serbian screenwriters
Male screenwriters
Serbian film directors